Saloon Song is an EP by the American indie band The Prom.  It was released on July 3, 2001 on Barsuk.

Track listing
"Saloon" 
"Now And Then"
"Jean Alexander Waltz (Sleepy Version)"

The Prom (band) albums
2001 EPs